Kozin may refer to the following localities:

Kozin, Lubusz Voivodeship (west Poland)
Kozin, Masovian Voivodeship (east-central Poland)
Kozin, Pomeranian Voivodeship (north Poland)
Kozin, Warmian-Masurian Voivodeship (north Poland)
Kozyn, a town in Ukraine
Kozin (surname)